David Williams (born June 19, 1988) is an American former professional racing cyclist. He rode in the men's team time trial at the 2015 UCI Road World Championships. In 2014 and 2015, Williams finished third in the United States National Time Trial Championships.

References

External links
 

1988 births
Living people
American male cyclists
Place of birth missing (living people)
Marian University (Indiana) alumni